Landmark Sitcom Season is a BBC project, launched in March 2016, to mark 60 years since Hancock's Half Hour started on BBC television.

As part of ongoing celebrations throughout 2016, the BBC has commissioned new scripts for iconic British sitcoms of the last six decades.

Sitcoms

New episodes
The landmark sitcom season began in the summer of 2016 with a live airing of Mrs. Brown's Boys.

Lost sitcoms
In addition to the new episodes produced, the BBC also commissioned remakes of three episodes from its classic sitcoms under the banner of the "Lost Sitcoms". Of these, the selected episodes of both Till Death Us Do Part and Hancock's Half Hour are missing from the BBC archives, while the episode of Steptoe and Son, originally broadcast in colour, exists only as an off-air black & white videotape recording.

Under consideration 
Another sitcom marked for possible remake and broadcast is Up Pompeii!.

References

2016 British television series debuts
2016 British television series endings
BBC Radio comedy programmes
BBC television sitcoms 
Lost BBC episodes 
English-language television shows